Fell is a municipality in the Trier-Saarburg district of  Rhineland-Palatinate, Germany.

Near Fell there is the Slate mine Fell and the Feller Bach, a tributary of the river Moselle.

References

Trier-Saarburg